Tim Sparv (born 20 February 1987) is a Finnish former professional footballer who played as a defensive midfielder. Sparv was born in Oravais, and started his football career in Norrvalla FF youth team before moving to Southampton's junior organisation. He began his senior club career playing for Halmstad, before signing with Groningen in 2010.

Sparv made his international debut for Finland in February 2009, at the age of 21 and went on to make 84 caps, including appearing in 2010, 2014 and 2018 FIFA World Cup qualifications. His family is a member of the Swedish-speaking population of Finland.

Club career

Southampton
Born in Oravais, Ostrobothnia, Sparv spent three years in the youth academy of Southampton. He was a member of Southampton's youth team that reached the final of the FA Youth Cup in 2005, where he played alongside Theo Walcott, losing on aggregate to Ipswich Town. He was named in the first team squad for 2006–07 season and made numerous reserve team appearances but, as Southampton had a plethora of midfielders from which to choose, he was unable to break through into the first team itself.

Halmstad
On 7 January 2007, he moved to Halmstads BK to play in Allsvenskan, on the advice of both his father and former Halmstads BK player Michael Svensson.  He made his Allsvenskan debut on 9 April 2007 in a match against Helsingborg when he replaced Andreas Johansson as a substitute for the second period. On 1 May 2008, he was loaned out to Vaasan Palloseura after suffering illness as well as a lack of playing time with Halmstads.

Groningen
In August 2009, he was close to a move to Groningen, but Halmstad refused to let him go at that point. On 14 August, FC Groningen announced that Sparv would join them as of 1 January 2010. He made his Eredivisie debut on 7 March 2010 in a 1–0 victory over VVV-Venlo, coming on for Fredrik Stenman in the 78th minute. He scored his first goal for Groningen in the opening match of the 2010–11 season, a 1–1 draw against AZ. His goal came in the 76th minute.

Greuther Fürth
In May 2013 Sparv signed a three-year contract with Greuther Fürth. He made his 2. Bundesliga debut on 21 July 2013 in a match against Arminia Bielefeld. He scored his first and only league goal for the club on 30 September 2013 in a 4–0 victory over Dynamo Dresden. The goal was the last of the game and came in the 86th minute.

FC Midtjylland
On 3 July 2014, Tim Sparv signed a four-year contract with Danish Superliga side FC Midtjylland. On 20 August 2015, he scored against former club Southampton in the 2015–16 Europa League play-off first leg, which ended in a 1–1 draw. He also started the second leg in Denmark which Midtjylland won, to secure the Danish club a place in the group stage and send Southampton out of the competition.

AEL FC
On 26 August 2020, Sparv signed a two-year contract with Greek Super League club AEL. On 14 May 2021, there was an official announcement about the termination of the player's contract by mutual agreement.

HJK
On 22 July 2021, Sparv joined HJK. He made his debut on 12 August when he came in as a substitute for Filip Valenčič on 82nd minute in a UEFA Europa League match against Neftçi Baku.

International career

Finland youth teams
Sparv was the second youngest player in the squad for the 2003 FIFA U-17 World Championship played at home but did not make an appearance in the tournament. He made his Finland U21 debut on 7 October 2006 and played a big part in the successful 2009 European Championship qualifying campaign, playing in nine out of ten games and scoring three goals. He was made team captain during the 2009 UEFA European Under-21 Football Championship and scored a penalty in a 2–1 defeat by England on 15 June 2009.

Finland first team
On 4 February 2009, Sparv made his debut for the senior team in a friendly match against Japan, which ended in a 5–1 defeat. He played his first FIFA World Cup qualification game on 10 October 2009 when Stuart Baxter chose him to the starting line up against Wales in Helsinki Olympic Stadium. He was named captain of the national team for the first time for a match against Greece on 4 September 2015.

Sparv was called up for the UEFA Euro 2020 pre-tournament friendly match against Sweden on 29 May 2021. In UEFA Euro 2020 Group B he captained Finland in matches against Denmark and Belgium but missed match against Russia.

Personal life
Sparv is a Swedish-speaking Finn.

Sparv is in a relationship with Jitka Nováčková, a Czech model and winner of the Czech Miss 2011 beauty pageant. Their daughter Leah was born in January 2021.

In September 2021, Sparv publicly criticized the conditions for migrant workers that had been constructing the stadiums for the 2022 FIFA World Cup in Qatar in an article in The Players' Tribune.

Career statistics

Club

International

Scores and results list Finland's goal tally first, score column indicates score after each Sparv goal.

Honours
FC Midtjylland
 Danish Superliga: 2014–15, 2017–18, 2019–20
 Danish Cup:  2018–19

Finland
Baltic Cup: runner-up 2012; bronze 2014

Individual
Finland U21 Player of the Year: 2007 
FC Midtjylland Player of the Year: 2015
Finnish Footballer of the Year: 2015

References

External links

 FC Midtjylland official profile 
 Tim Sparv – SPL competition record
 
 
 
 
 

1987 births
Living people
People from Vörå
Finnish footballers
Finnish expatriate footballers
Finland international footballers
Finland youth international footballers
Finland under-21 international footballers
Association football midfielders
Southampton F.C. players
Halmstads BK players
Vaasan Palloseura players
FC Groningen players
SpVgg Greuther Fürth players
FC Midtjylland players
Athlitiki Enosi Larissa F.C. players
Allsvenskan players
Veikkausliiga players
Eredivisie players
2. Bundesliga players
Danish Superliga players
Super League Greece players
UEFA Euro 2020 players
Expatriate footballers in England
Finnish expatriate sportspeople in England
Expatriate footballers in Sweden
Finnish expatriate sportspeople in Sweden
Expatriate footballers in the Netherlands
Finnish expatriate sportspeople in the Netherlands
Expatriate men's footballers in Denmark
Finnish expatriate sportspeople in Denmark
Expatriate footballers in Germany
Expatriate footballers in Greece
Swedish-speaking Finns
Sportspeople from Ostrobothnia (region)